Aslanyan or Aslanian (reformed spelling Ասլանյան or classical spelling Ասլանեան, from the Turkish "Aslan" meaning "lion") is an Armenian surname. Notable persons with that name include:

 Amir Hossein Aslanian (born 1979), Iranian footballer
 Arpiar Aslanian (1895–1945), Armenian lawyer, member of the French Resistance; husband of Louise
 Grégoire Aslan (born Krikor Aslanian, 1908–1982), Armenian actor
 Igor Aslanyan (born 1967), Russian footballer
 Louise Aslanian (1906–1945), French anti-fascist, communist, writer, novelist, poetess and a prominent figure in the French Resistance; wife of Arpiar
 Ludmila Aslanian (born 1954), Armenian chess player
 Norair Aslanyan (born 1991), Armenian footballer
 Samvel Aslanyan (born 1986), Russian handball player
 Sergei Aslanyan (journalist) (born 1966), Russian radio journalist
 Sergey Aslanyan (entrepreneur) (born 1973), Russian entrepreneur

See also
 Arslanian
 Aslan (disambiguation)

Armenian-language surnames